Chalcides lanzai, or Lanza's skink, is a species of skink, a lizard in the family Scincidae. The species is endemic to Morocco.

Taxonomy
Chalcides lanzai has been considered a subspecies of Chalcides montanus and of Chalcides ocellatus.

Etymology
The specific name, lanzai, is in honor of Italian herpetologist Benedetto Lanza.

Habitat
C. lanzai is usually found in forest and grassland areas, and is common in the areas where it can be found.

Conservation status
C. lanzai is unlikely to be under serious threat, though it has been affected from habitat degradation due to overgrazing.

Reproduction
Adult females of the species C. lanzai give birth to live young.

References

Further reading
 (1967). "Notes sur les sauriens du genre Chalcides (Scincidés). II. Premièr note sur le complexe de Chalcides ocellatus, avec description de Chalcides ocellatus lanzai". Bulletin de la Société des Sciences Naturelles et Physiques du Maroc 47: 395–398. (Chalcides ocellatus lanzai, new subspecies). (in French).

Chalcides
Skinks of Africa
Reptiles described in 1967
Endemic fauna of Morocco
Reptiles of North Africa
Taxa named by Georges Pasteur